The Hongtoushan mine is one of the largest zinc mines in China.  The mine is located in Fushun, Liaoning province, China. The mine has reserves amounting to 22.6 million tonnes of ore grading 3.04% zinc, thus resulting 0.69 million tonnes of zinc.

References 

Lead and zinc mines in China